Anadyomene may refer to:

Anadyomene (alga), a species of alga
Venus Anadyomene, a representation of the goddess Venus/Aphrodite
Anadyomene (Adoration of Aphrodite), an orchestral composition by Einojuhani Rautavaara